The Apostolic Exarchate of the Greek Catholic Church in the Czech Republic is an Eastern Catholic institution overseeing Catholics of byzantine-slavonic rite in the Czech Republic. It uses the localized Byzantine Rite in archaic Church Slavonic language.
Its cathedral episcopal see is St. Clement's Cathedral, Prague.

History 
On March 13, 1996, Pope John Paul II proclaimed a new Apostolic Exarchate (exempt pre-diocese) for Eastern Catholics of the Byzantine Rite in the Czech Republic under the rule of the Apostolic See. The church was built on territory previously covered by the Byzantine Rite, the Slovak Catholic Metropolitanate sui juris of Prešov.

The Apostolic Exarchate provides a legal organization for Catholics of the Ruthenian Church living in the Czech Republic. The head of the church is a bishop, who has the same rights as a diocesan bishop. An exarchate is the initial stage of an eparchy (the equivalent of a diocese in the Latin rites), which is exempt, i.e. not part of any ecclesiastical province but directly subject to the Holy See. It is supervised by the Roman Dicastery for the Eastern Churches, a Roman Curia dicastery acting on behalf of the Pope.

Statistics 
According to the 2011 census there were 9,927 Byzantine Catholics in the Czech Republic. In July 2016 according to the Statistics from the Annuario Pontificio 2016 compiled by Ron Roberson there is a combined Byzantine or Constantinopolitan Tradition (“Greek Catholic”) count of 7,677,373 for which the Ruthenian Apostolic Exarchate in the Czech Republic in Prague makes up 17,000 of. Currently there are 20 parishes and 12 chapels organized into seven deaneries and served by 25 priests.

Additionally, significant proportion of believers are workers and refugees from Ukraine.

Apostolic Exarchs 
The following is a list of the hierarchs of the Apostolic Exarchate and their terms of service:
1. Ivan Ljavinec, Titular Bishop of Acalissus (January 18, 1996 – April 23, 2003)
2. Ladislav Hučko, Titular Bishop of Horæa (April 24, 2003 – ), also Secretary General of Czech Bishops’ Conference (2005 – 2011.07.01)
 Ján Eugen Kočiš, Auxiliary Bishop, Titular Bishop of Abrittum (April 24, 2004 – October 7, 2006)

See also 
 List of Catholic dioceses (structured view)
 Ruthenian Catholic Metropolitan Church of Pittsburgh, the Ruthenian Catholics' only province, in Northern America

References

Sources and external links
 GigaCatholic.org, with incumbent biography links
 Apoštolský exarchát řeckokatolické církve v České republice (Czech language)
 Profile at catholic-hierarchy.org

Czech
Ruthenian Catholic Church
Eastern Christianity in the Czech Republic
Christian organizations established in 1996
1996 establishments in the Czech Republic
Catholic Church in the Czech Republic
Eastern Catholic Churches